HMS Reedham was one of 93 ships of the  of inshore minesweepers.

The ship was named after Reedham in Norfolk. It portrayed the fictional HMS Compton in the 1959 film The Navy Lark.

References
Blackman, R.V.B. ed. Jane's Fighting Ships (1953)

 

Ham-class minesweepers
Royal Navy ship names
1958 ships
Ships built on the Isle of Wight